The Ṭabahatan is one of the most commonly recited prayers in Mandaeism, in which the reciter asks for the forgiveness of sins. As a commemoration prayer with a long list of names, the prayer starts with the line ṭab ṭaba lṭabia ("Good is the Good for the Good"). A different version of this prayer is found in DC 42, Šarḥ ḏ-Ṭabahata ("The Scroll of Ṭabahata" [Parents]), which is used during Parwanaya rituals.

The Ṭabahatan prayer is numbered as Prayer 170 in E. S. Drower's version of the Qolasta, which was based on manuscript 53 of the Drower Collection (abbreviated DC 53). The Šal Šulta (Prayer 171) directly follows the Ṭabahatan prayer.

Prayer
Drower's (1959) version of the Tabahatan lists the following uthras and ancestors.

See also
Scroll of the Ancestors
Brakha (daily prayer in Mandaeism)
Asiet Malkia
Rahma (Mandaeism)
Qolasta
Litany of the Saints
Intercession of saints

References

Mandaic words and phrases
Mandaean prayer
Litanies